The Andorran records in swimming are the fastest ever performances of swimmers from Andorra, which are recognised and ratified by the Federació Andorrana de Natació (FAN).

All records were set in finals unless noted otherwise.

Long Course (50 m)

Men

Women

Mixed relay

Short Course (25 m)

Men

Women

Mixed relay

References
General
Andorran Long Course Records 13 March 2023 updated
Andorran Short Course Records 21 February 2023 updated
Andorran Records – Men 23 December 2022 updated
Andorran Records – Women 21 February 2023 updated
Specific

External links
FAN web site

Andorra
Records
Swimming
Swimming